Hiram Johnson (born September 7, 1839) was a Michigan politician of the Democratic Party who served as a member of the Michigan House of Representatives from 1891 to 1892.

Johnson was elected to the position of state representative on November 4, 1890. Johnson was sworn in on January 7, 1891.

References 

1839 births
Democratic Party members of the Michigan House of Representatives
19th-century American politicians
Year of death missing